Earthride is an American doom metal band from Maryland.

Biography
Earthride formed in 2000 after the demise of Dave Sherman's previous band, Spirit Caravan. They released their self-titled EP the same year on their own Earth Brain label. They recorded their next release, 2005 Vampire Circus, with Corrosion of Conformity's Mike Dean acting as producer. It was released on Southern Lord Records. Five years later they followed with their third album, Something Wicked, which was also released by Southern Lord.

In 2007, Land o Smiles Records re-released Earthride's self-titled debut EP on 10" vinyl. In the same year, Dave Sherman, Eric Little, Greg Lynn Ball and Edmund Allan Brown recorded a new single on Salt of the Earth Records.

In November 2017, Earthride toured with Buzzov-en. At a stop in Dayton, Ohio, they were joined by Funeral Moon.

Members
Dave Sherman - vocals (died 2022)
Greg Lyle Ball – guitars
Edmond Allan Brown– bass
Eric Little – drums

Discography

Albums
Taming of the Demons CD (Southern Lord Records 2002)
Vampire Circus CD/Pic Disc (Southern Lord Records/Doomentia Records 2005)
Something Wicked CD (Earth Brain Records 2010)

EPs
Earthride CD (Earth Brain Records 2000)
Earthride 10" (Land o' Smiles Records 2007)

References

External links
Southern Lord band page (archived)
 

American doom metal musical groups
Heavy metal musical groups from Maryland
American stoner rock musical groups
Southern Lord Records artists
Musical groups established in 2000
Musical quartets